Thalassotrechus is a genus of ground beetles in the family Carabidae. This genus has a single species, Thalassotrechus barbarae. It is found in Mexico and the United States.

References

Trechinae